This song is not to be confused with the Bridie Gallagher song "The Hills of Donegal".

"Las Vegas (In the Hills of Donegal)" is a song by the Irish folk rock group Goats Don't Shave. It was a top 10 hit for the band in 1991, reaching #4 on the Irish singles chart.

Lyrics and meaning
The lyrics of the song tell of the speaker's desire to turn County Donegal, described to be fame-less and unknown, into a gambling hub, ala Las Vegas. He speaks of walling it off from the rest of Ireland while legalizing casinos and brothels. There are several references made to people from popular and business culture including Jack the Ripper, Neil Blaney, Brigitte Nielsen, Mike Tyson and Donald Trump.

Release and reception
It was first released by the Goats Don't Shave in 1992 with the release of their album, The Rusty Razor. The song found new popularity in the 2000s, not only among people from County Donegal, but people from all over Ireland. The album was a mix of modern material and traditional Irish folk written mostly by Pat Gallagher.

Cover versions
The song has been covered by many other artists including The Dubliners.
Charlie and the Bhoys
Mike Denver
Scythian
Nathan Carter
The Irish Rovers

Legacy
The song was blared from the Croke Park PA system after Donegal won the Sam Maguire Cup in 2012. It was again played on the Croke Park PA system just before Donegal were presented with the National League Division 2(football) Cup in April 2019.

See also

 Donald Trump in music

References

External links
 Lyrics
 Backing Track 

Irish songs
Irish folk songs
Songs about Ireland
Songs about Donald Trump